Erik Spiekermann (born 30 May 1947 in Stadthagen, Lower Saxony) is a German typographer, designer and writer. He is an honorary professor at the University of the Arts Bremen and ArtCenter College of Design.

Biography
Spiekermann studied art history at Berlin's Free University, funding himself by running a letterpress printing press in the basement of his house.

Between 1972  and 1979, he worked as a freelance graphic designer in London before returning to Berlin and founding MetaDesign with two partners.

In 1989, he and his then-wife Joan Spiekermann started FontShop, the first mail-order distributor for digital fonts. FontShop International followed and now publishes the FontFont range of typefaces. MetaDesign combined clean, teutonic-looking information design and complex corporate design systems for clients like BVG (Berlin Transit), Düsseldorf Airport, Audi, Volkswagen and Heidelberg Printing, amongst others.

In 2001, Spiekermann left MetaDesign over policy disagreements and started United Designers Network, with offices in Berlin, London, and San Francisco.

In April 2006, the Art Center College of Design in Pasadena awarded Spiekermann an Honorary Doctorship for his contribution to design. His family of typefaces for Deutsche Bahn (German Railways), designed with Christian Schwartz, received a Gold Medal at the German Federal Design Prize in 2006, the highest such award in Germany. In May 2007, he was the first designer to be elected into the European Design Awards Hall of Fame.

In January 2007, UDN was renamed SpiekermannPartners. In January 2009, SpiekermannPartners merged with Dutch design agency Eden Design & Communication and continued its operations under the name Edenspiekermann . Edenspiekermann currently run offices in Amsterdam, Berlin, San Francisco and Los Angeles.
He now runs an experimental letterpress workshop in Berlin, Hacking Gutenberg (www.hackinggutenberg.berlin)

Spiekermann is considered a very influential personality in the field of typeface design and information design. He often attends international meetings, and has been giving a substantial contribution in several fields, such as app development and public wayfinding.

Notable works

Spiekermann has designed many commercial typefaces as well as typefaces as part of corporate design programmes.

 Berliner Grotesk (original is from 1913, digitization is from c. 1978)
 Lo-Type (original is from 1911/14, digitization is from 1980)
 ITC Officina Sans (1990)
 ITC Officina Serif (1990)
 FF Meta (1991–1998)
 FF Govan (2001)
 FF Info (2000)
 Nokia Sans (2002-2011, corporate typeface for Nokia and the default UI font for Symbian S60 smartphones)
 FF Unit (2003)
 FF Meta Serif (with Christian Schwartz and Kris Sowersby, 2007)
 FF Unit Slab (with Christian Schwartz and Kris Sowersby, 2009)
 Fira Sans (designed in collaboration with Ralph du Carrois) for Firefox OS, released in 2013 under the SIL Open Font License)
 FF Real  (with Anja Meiners and Ralph du Carrois, 2011)
 Case, Case Text, Case Micro (with Anja Meiners and Ralph du Carrois, 2020)

Spiekermann co-authored Stop Stealing Sheep & Find Out How Type Works. He also participated in the creation of numerous corporate identities and other works, including redesigns of the publications The Economist and Reason.

Spiekermann also appeared in the documentary Helvetica.

Awards
2003 – Gerrit Noordzij Prize
2006 – German Design Award
2007 – European Design Awards Hall of Fame
2007 – Honorary Royal Designer for Industry, Royal Society for the encouragement of Arts, Manufactures & Commerce, London
2011 – Lifetime achievement award from German Design Prize 
2011 – TCD Medal Lifetime Award

See also
 First Things First 2000 manifesto

References

Further reading
Erik Spiekermann, E. M. Ginger: Stop Stealing Sheep & Find Out How Type Works, third edition, Adobe Press, 2013, .
Erik Spiekermann: ÜberSchrift, Hermann Schmidt Mainz, 2004, .
Erik Spiekermann, Jan Middendorp, Made with FontFont, BIS Publishers, 2006, .
Erik Spiekermann et al., FontBook, FontShop International Berlin, 2006.
Fay Sweet: MetaDesign: Design from the Word Up, Thames and Hudson, 1999. .
Erik Spiekermann, M. Klein, Y. Schwemmer-Scheddin: Type and Typographers, Phaidon Press, 1991. .
 Emigre 51: First Things First, 1999. Issue 51
 Erler, J., Hello I am Erik. Erik Spiekermann : typographer, designer, entrepreneur, Die Gestalten Verlag, 2014.  .

External links

Erik Spiekermann’s blog
Edenspiekermann
letterpress workshop
Biography and list of Spiekermann’s typefaces on FontFont.com
Erik Spiekermann appears in the documentary Helvetica
Postage stamps designed by Erik Spiekermann
Erik Spiekermann on Workspiration – quick interview about work

1947 births
Living people
People from Stadthagen
German graphic designers
Design writers
German typographers and type designers
Berlin University of the Arts alumni